Vern Yip (born June 27, 1968, in Hong Kong) is an American interior designer based in Atlanta, Georgia.  He periodically appeared on TLC's Trading Spaces through its fourth season, and was known for frequently including silk, candles and flowers in the rooms he designed. He is one of the panel of judges on HGTV's Design Star. Yip hosted four seasons of HGTV's show Deserving Design. Yip hosted an HGTV special called Urban Oasis, in which he designed a Chicago loft in the Trump International Hotel.

Early life
Yip went to high school in northern Virginia at McLean High School in the class of 1986. Yip double-majored in Chemistry and Economics at his alma mater, the University of Virginia, and later received a masters in management and architecture from the Georgia Institute of Technology. Although he considered opening a design firm in Atlanta, Georgia, Yip says he is happy in his television roles "transforming lives through design".

Personal life
Yip and his partner, Craig Koch, have a son who was born in 2010. The couple's second child, a girl, was born in 2011.

References

External links 

1968 births
Living people
American interior designers
American people of Hong Kong descent
Georgia Tech alumni
American LGBT broadcasters
Participants in American reality television series
University of Virginia alumni
American LGBT people of Asian descent